A ship replica is a reconstruction of a no longer existing ship. Replicas can range from authentically reconstructed, fully seaworthy ships, to ships of modern construction that give an impression of a historic vessel. Some replicas may not even be seaworthy, but built for other educational or entertainment purposes.

Reasons to build a replica include historic research into shipbuilding, national pride, exposition at a museum or entertainment (e.g., for a TV series), and/or education programs for the unemployed. For example, see the project to build a replica of the Continental brig . Apart from building a genuine replica of the ship, sometimes the construction materials, tools and methods can also copied from the ships' original era, as is the case with the replica of Batavia in Lelystad and the ship of the line replica  in Rotterdam (Delfshaven).

Definition

The term "replica" in this context does not normally include scale models. The term museum ship is used for an old ship that has been preserved and converted into a museum open to the public.

A ship replica may also be a generic replica, one that represents a certain type of ship rather than a particular historic example, like Kamper Kogge, replicating the Cogs that were used extensively in Northern Europe by the Hanseatic League in the Middle Ages, but where there is little knowledge of specific ships.

Some generic type replicas such as Thor Heyerdahl's Ra II, qualify as true replicas as these ships were built to investigate the craft and or culture of the original era. That they do not replicate a specific vessel is mainly because no details of such a specific vessel are available.

Some other ships that are modeled after ships of a certain type or era (and are in that sense replicas) do not qualify as true replicas. Some ships may be borderline cases, such as Kanrin Maru, which is actually twice the size of the original, but built following the plans of the original.

Replicas can be temporary, cheap and very simple, such as the replica of a Viking ship that was burnt at the Leixlip Festival.

Notable historic type ships that are not replicas include:
  (1795) is strictly speaking not a replica but the original vessel. However, most of the ship's timber has been replaced over time, with only 10-15% of the original remaining. This is a modern version of the philosopher's dilemma concerning replica versus original; known as the Ship of Theseus dilemma.
  (1765) is still the original vessel, although unlike Constitution, she is in dry dock and does not sail. She has also been heavily restored, with only 10-15% of her original timber remaining.
 Mircea, which is an almost exact copy of Gorch Fock. Mircea was built as a copy because Gorch Fock was a very successful ship. Thus Mircea was not built as a replica per se, but as a copy for other reasons (i.e. to perform economically, in this case as a training vessel).
 Stad Amsterdam is a generic clipper type ship combining the best qualities of clippers of the past with modern materials and technologies.

Another ambiguous case subject to the Ship of Theseus dilemma is Niagara. The original was sunk in 1820 for preservation, and the ship has been rebuilt three times since. The third reconstruction was considerably more extensive, and the only parts from the original which were retained are non-structural, leading many authorities to classify her as a replica, rather than a reconstructed original.

Notable ship replicas
Some sailing ship replicas with their home port; and key information of the original (many articles are about the original ship):

Europe, Middle East, Australia and the Americas

Austronesia

East Asia
 Kanrin Maru; Minami Awaji harbour, Japan; a double-size replica of a Japanese warship
Namihaya; Osaka Maritime Museum, Japan; 5th-century Japanese ship replica
Naniwa Maru; Osaka Maritime Museum, Japan; Edo period merchant ship
San Juan Bautista; Ishinomaki, Japan; a Japanese warship
Turtle ship; a generic replica of a Korean ship
Michinoku Maru; Michinoku Traditional Wooden Boat Museum, Japan; 18th-century Japanese trade ship (Kitamae Bune) replica
Princess Taiping; a replica of a Ming Dynasty Chinese junk.
Replica (stationary, not seaworthy) of a Chinese treasure ship, in the Treasure Boat Shipyard Park, Nanjing
Dingyuan; a replica of an Imperial Chinese ironclad from the late 19th century

Other vessels
 SS Bandırma; Turkish passenger cargo vessel
Jewel of Muscat; Omani 9th-century sailing ship built to retrace the route of the original ship from Oman to Singapore.
 Ictineu II; Barcelona, Spain; a replica of the first mechanically powered steam driven submarine.
 The Hjortspring Boat is replica of a Danish Iron Age rowing boat.
At the Viking Ship Museum in Roskilde, replicas of Viking ships are built.
 Various projects for building replicas of the ill-fated  have been proposed over the years. The first Titanic replica to actually commence construction is being built by Chinese firm Seven Star Energy Investment; by summer 2021, the hull is essentially complete and construction of the superstructure is beginning. The ship will not sail on any ocean, but be permanently docked on a river in Sichuan province to function as the main attraction for the Romandisea Seven Star International Cultural Tourism Resort.
 Various "replicas" of Noah's Ark have been built. Whether they are properly regarded as "replicas" depends on whether one takes the Biblical flood story as mythology or fact. Since the Biblical description of the vessel is very brief beyond the basic measures, the exact design of any "replica" is necessarily conjectural.

See also
 Barcelona Charter
 Experimental archaeology
 List of museum ships
 Museum ship
 Replica
 Ship of Theseus
 Tim Severin - Recreating ancient voyages
 Viking ship replica

References

External links

 Replica of Captain Cook's ship, Whitby
 1985 Godspeed Voyage
 Historic Tall Ship Replicas, Extensive photo gallery, overview of ship replicas all over the world
 Sea Club Polar Odyssey
 The wooden ships company "Varyag"
 Ivlia.Verein für Altschiffbau

Replica
 
Shipbuilding